Manihot is a genus in the diverse milkspurge family, Euphorbiaceae. It was described as a genus in 1754.

Species of Manihot are monoecious trees, shrubs and a few herbs that are native to the Americas, from Arizona in the United States south to Argentina and Uruguay. The best known member of this genus is the widely cultivated cassava (Manihot esculenta).

Manihot species are used as food plants by the larvae of some species of Lepidoptera including Endoclita sericeus and Hypercompe hambletoni.

Species

variety treated as a species
 Manihot carthaginensis subsp. glaziovii = Manihot glaziovii (Müll.Arg.) Allem

formerly included
moved to Aleurites Cnidoscolus Jatropha

Pollination
Monoecy was demonstrated by Jennings 1963 and George & Shifriss 1967.

References

External links

Manihoteae
Euphorbiaceae genera
Taxa named by Philip Miller